Chief Alimotu Pelewura (1865–1951) was a Nigerian trader who was leader of the Lagos Market Women's Association, a Lagos-based market women advocacy group. She was also an important political ally of Herbert Macaulay.

The Lagos Market Women's Association  was one of the most important women's organization in Lagos during the colonial period.

Early life
Pelewura was born in Lagos to a large polygynous family, she was the elder of two children born by her biological mother. Her mother was a fish trader and Pelewura also chose fish trading as an occupation. By 1900, she had become an important market women leader and trader and in 1910 was given a chieftaincy title by Oba Eshugbayi Eleko. In the 1920s, she was leader of the Ereko meat market and with the support of Herbert Macaulay, she rose to become the leader of the newly formed Lagos Market Women Association. She belonged to the Awori tribe of the Yoruba people

LMWA
The Lagos Market Women's Association was founded in the 1920s by Pelewura and a few other market leaders. Pelewura, a fish trader was the alaga (head) of the Ereko market became the association's premier president. During her reign, LMWA protested against imposed taxation and price controls of produce both incidents she believed will impact negatively on the livelihood of women.

Politics and agitation against taxation
In the 1932, Pelewura led market women in protest against direct taxation of women by the colonial government. When rumors surfaced about a proposed tax on women, Pelewura was a member of a committee of women that marched to the government house in protest against the proposed plan. In the same year, due to her leadership of the protest, she was appointed as a women's representative in the Ilu Committee, an advisory group organized by the Oba of Lagos. In the mid 1930s, she led a protest against the relocation of the Ereko market to the Oluwole area of Lagos, Pelewura and some Ereko women attempted to physically block any relocation action by authorities which led to her detention. The market women in Lagos rallied in her support and she and other women detainees were released.

In 1940, the colonial government proposed a new taxation plan on women who earned above 50 pounds. Female taxation was a novelty in Yorubaland and the women again rose in protest, Pelewura and other women objected because of its novelty and also because of the challenging economic difficulties such as high unemployment rates as a result of World War II. Though not many market women among the 8,000 plus members of her organization earned above 50 pounds, she felt it could be a slippery slope towards full taxation of women. However, on taxation of women, the colonial government did not budge but responded by increasing the taxable income to those earning more than 200 pounds.

In 1939, Pelewura became an executive member of the Nigerian Union of Young Democrats, a youthful party that was closely aligned with NNDP.  She sometimes acted as a speaker in NNDP's rallies and spoke publicly on behalf of NNDP candidates even though women were disenfranchised. She was also briefly a member of the Oyinkan Abayomi led Nigerian Women's Party.

Price control
During World War II, inflation rose in Lagos as a result of food scarcity. In 1941, to control the wartime economy, the government enacted a flexible price control policy on certain food produce that will be reviewed periodically. Due to widespread opposition and non adherence to the policy, the government made plans to control the sale of food produce through multinationals. The market women led by Pelewura objected to the policy stating that it will deprive women of needed income. However, the colonial government was adamant on keeping the price regulation of produce. The situation led to conflicts between LMWA and the colonial government.

Pelewura died in 1951. She was succeeded by one of her followers, Chief Abibatu Mogaji.

Legacy 
Pelewura was depicted in the 2019 biopic, The Herbert Macaulay Affair.

References

Sources

Further reading
 Somotan, H.T. 2018. Lagos Women in Colonial History: a biographical sketch of Alimotu Pelewura (Vestiges Biographical Sketch Series Sketch 1). Vestiges: Traces of Record 4, 72–74. DOI: 10.6084/m9.figshare.6894770

Nigerian women activists
1951 deaths
Yoruba women activists
People from colonial Nigeria
Yoruba women in business
20th-century Nigerian businesspeople
Businesspeople from Lagos
1865 births
19th-century Nigerian businesspeople
History of women in Lagos
Yoruba women in politics
Women in Lagos politics
20th-century Nigerian politicians
20th-century Nigerian women politicians
Nigerian National Democratic Party politicians
19th-century Nigerian businesswomen
20th-century Nigerian businesswomen